Housen Mushema is a Ugandan runway, commercial and editorial model, actor and fashion producer known for playing the lead role of Balikoowa in Balikoowa in the City, Sokke on The Hostel, Andrew on Second Chance, Ben Ssali on Power of Legacy, Ian on Mistakes Girls Do, Michael on Veronica's Wish, Anthony on Bed of Thorns and also had roles on other shows and films like November Tear, False Dreams and The Lukkas.

In June 2018, Mushema together with actors Eleano Nabwiso, Matthew Nabwiso, Richard Tuwangye, Roger Mugisha, Cleopatra Koheirwe and Jenkins Joel Mutumba, were hired by Development Channel to promote the African Child Poverty Alleviator  Program (ACPA) in the on-going Economic war. All actors were given a No Dropout tablet to use in the fight against poverty during the Economic war.

He is a recipient of the Abyranz Fashion and Style Awards 2015 in the  Outstanding Male Model category and he has hit most Man Crush Monday features in numerous magazines in Kampala and also appearing at number 7 on Satisfashion Ug Magazine's 8 most revered male models in Uganda in 2014.

Career

Modeling
Housen started modeling in 2013 while in his second year at Makerere University after his father became ill, forcing him to find a job to pay for his tuition. His first modeling job was as an usher at events before walking the runway or appearing in any magazines. He was signed by Joram Model Management in 2015.

In 2015 Housen won an award for the most outstanding Male Model Uganda at the Abryanz Style and Fashion Awards.
He has worked at a number of shows both local and International including  Kampala Fashion Week 2014, purpleRyan hub, Malengo Fashion Show, the Swahili Fashion Week, The bride and Groom Expo.2014/2016, Genesis Night by Hellen Lukoma (2014) and Abryanz Style and Fashion Awards (2013/2014/2015). He has also appeared and done photo shoots with biggest magazines in Uganda like the Bride and groom Magazine, the Flair and many more.

He has worked with numerous  designers including Jose Hendo (New York), Martha Jabo (Uganda), Motions (Rwanda),  Emolsam_DNA and so many others.

He produced the Hijab and Kanzu fashion show in 2016 and co-produced The Vintage fashion show alongside his boss Joram Muzira in 2017.

Acting 
Housen debuted his acting career in Shakespeare's  play Macbeth in 2014. In the same year he got a regular role on the fourth season of The Hostel (TV series) (Serenity) produced by Fast Truck Productions playing Sokke. The TV series aired on NTV Uganda.

In 2016 he got a lead role as Balikoowa in the local comedy/drama series “Balikoowa in the City” another production of Fast Track Productions that currently airs on Spark TV.

In May 2017 Housen took over the role of Andrew Masa from an original actor in Second Chance telenovela, a Ugandan remake of a popular Telemundo, El Cuerpo del Deseo. Second Chance airs on NTV UG and is produced by Phaz picture production alongside NTV Uganda.

Housen will play Mckenzie  Mulumba in a Nana Kagga directed and produced upcoming new series called Reflections alongside other big celebrities like Malayika Nnyanzi, Cleopatra Koheirwe, Gladys Oyenbot and Andrew Kyamagero.

He has also acted in a number of music videos such as Otubattisa by Irene Ntale and Sheebah Karungi in 2014 and in Kyanagwe by Leila Kayondo in 2017

Mushema's debut film role was in a leading role as Michael in a 2018 drama film Veronica's Wish, for which he received his first nomination. He was nominated for Best Actor in a Leading Role at the Uganda Film Awards 2018.

Personal life
Housen was born in Jinja and raised in Bweyogerere. He is a devout Muslim and the fourth and last child in the family. His father was a prominent tailor in Kampala, which introduced him to fashion.

Filmography

Film

Television series

Theater

Music videos

Nominations and awards

References

External links

1992 births
Living people
People from Kampala
21st-century Ugandan male actors
Ugandan male television actors
Ugandan male models
Ugandan male film actors
Ugandan fashion designers